Behrouz Nemati is an Iranian principlist politician who is currently a member of the Parliament of Iran representing Tehran, Rey, Shemiranat and Eslamshahr electoral district.

Career

Electoral history

References

Living people
Members of the 9th Islamic Consultative Assembly
Members of the 10th Islamic Consultative Assembly
1968 births
People from Hamadan Province
Followers of Wilayat fraction members